

Censorship in Israel is officially carried out by the Israeli Military Censor, a unit in the Israeli government officially tasked with carrying out preventive censorship regarding the publication of information that might affect the security of Israel. The body is headed by the Israeli Chief Censor, a military official appointed by Israel's Minister of Defense, who bestows upon the Chief Censor the authority to suppress information he deems compromising from being made public in the media, such as Israel's nuclear weapons program and Israel's military operations outside its borders. On average, 2240 press articles in Israel are censored by the Israeli Military Censor each year, approximately 240 of which in full, and around 2000 partially.

Articles concerning potentially controversial topics must be submitted to the Israeli Military Censor in advance; failing to do so may cause the reporter to lose his right to work as a journalist in Israel and, in the case of foreign reporters, to be barred from the country.

Censorship of press 
Reporters Without Borders report on Israel states that "Under Israel’s military censorship, reporting on a variety of security issues requires prior approval by the authorities. In addition to the possibility of civil defamation suits, journalists can also be charged with criminal defamation and “insulting a public official”. There is a freedom of information law but it is sometimes hard to implement. The confidentiality of sources is not protected by statutory law".

Every journalist working within Israel is required to be accredited by the Israeli Government Press Office. The office is allowed to deny applications based on political or security considerations.

Following the 2017 Qatar diplomatic crisis, Israel took steps to ban Qatar-based Al Jazeera by closing its Jerusalem office, revoking press cards, and asking cable and satellite broadcasters not to broadcast Al Jazeera. Defence minister Avigdor Lieberman had described some of Al Jazeera reports as "Nazi Germany–style" propaganda. It was not clear if the measures covered Al Jazeera English, considered less strident.

As of 2020, Israel ranks 88th in the World Press Freedom Index.

Censorship of Palestinian press 
Before the Oslo Accords, Israeli police and government controlled the Palestinian territories, and with this, Israel censored the books and information Palestinians can read and output. By 1991, some 10,000 books had been banned, fax machines had been banned, and a number of phone lines had been cut. In addition, publications of anything with content considered "political significance" in the West Bank, Palestinian territory, had been prohibited, and Arab publications had been be "completely stopped".

Reporters Without Borders have raised serious concern regarding the treatment of journalists in Israel, particularly Palestinian journalists. Their current section on Israel states: "[…] journalists are exposed to open hostility from members of the government. Smear campaigns have been waged against media outlets and journalists by politicians with the help of their party and supporters, exposing the targets to harassment and anonymous messages and forcing them seek personal protection. […] The Israel Defence Forces often violate the rights of Palestinian journalists, especially when they are covering demonstrations or clashes in the West Bank or Gaza Strip"

In their section on Palestine, they write that "the Israeli forces have continued to subject Palestinian journalists to arrest, interrogation and administrative detention, often without any clear grounds. In recent years, the Israeli authorities have also closed several Palestinian media outlets for allegedly inciting violence."

On 7 December 2021, Reporters Without Borders and the Euro-Mediterranean Human Rights Monitor called for an immediate end to the Israeli travel bans that prevent dozens of Palestinian journalists, from leaving the West Bank and Gaza Strip. At that time, RSF was aware of at least 21 Palestinian journalists who were banned from travelling abroad. In many cases, the travel bans have remained in place for years.

On 18 August 2022, Israeli forces issued military orders imposing the closure of the seven prominent Palestinian human rights groups’ offices. The UN and other international organizations condemned Israel’s escalating attacks against Palestinian civil society.

The killing of journalists 
In 2019, Christophe Deloire, director-general of Reporters Without Borders, accused Israel of war crimes after two journalists were shot and killed by the Israeli Defense Forces in Gaza while covering a protest. In an interview with the Jerusalem Post, Deloire said that "when Israel shot those journalists, it was intentional… The journalists could be clearly identified as journalists, with cameras and jackets and it could not be just by chance".

A commission of inquiry mandated by the United Nations Human Rights Council came to the conclusion that the shooting with live ammunition by the Israeli Defense Forces, which ultimately resulted in 183 casualties, was a "serious human rights and humanitarian law violations" which "may constitute war crimes or crimes against humanity". The Commission found "reasonable grounds" to believe that Israeli snipers shot at journalists, while knowing they were clearly recognizable as such.

According to the Committee to Protect Journalists, 18 Palestinian journalists were killed in Israel and the Occupied Palestinian Territories between 2001–2021.

In 2021, Israel bombed and completely destroyed the building with the headquarters of the Associated Press and Al Jazeera in the Gaza Strip.

In 2022, Palestinian-American journalist Shireen Abu Akleh was killed with a shot to her head while covering an operation of the Israel Defense Forces in the Palestinian city of Jenin. Upon doing its own investigation, American news channel CNN concluded that her death was the result of a targeted Israeli killing. On 5 September, the IDF admitted a "high possibility" that the journalist was "accidentally hit" by army fire, but said that, despite US requests to do so, it would not undertake a criminal investigation into her death.

Military censorship 
The Israeli Military Censor has the power to prevent publication of certain news items. The censorship rules largely concern military issues such as not reporting if a missile hit or missed its target, troop movements, etc. but it is also empowered to control information about the oil industry and water supply. Journalists who bypass the military censor or publish items that were censored may be subject to criminal prosecution and jail time; the censor also has the authority to close newspapers. However, these extreme measures have been rarely used. One notable instance where a newspaper was closed temporarily was in the case of the Kav 300 affair where it was eventually discovered that the censor was used by the Shin Bet to cover up internal wrongdoings in the agency and led to one of the biggest public scandals in Israel during the 1980s.  Following the incident the two main papers, HaAretz and Yediot Ahronot stopped participating in the Editors' Committee.

In 1996 a new agreement was reached and the Editors' Committee resumed operation. The new agreement allowed military censorship only of articles clearly harmful to national security and allowed the supreme court to override military decisions.

According to information provided by the military censor in response to a Freedom of Information request, in 2017 the censor banned the publication of 271 articles outright, and fully or partially redacted 21% of the articles submitted to it.

In 2018, the censor prohibited the publication of 363 news articles, and partially or fully redacted 2,712 news items submitted to it for prior review. This amounts to more than one news piece being censored and seven news items being redacted per day, on average.

One very commonly used way for Israeli media to circumvent censorship rules is to leak items to foreign news sources, which by virtue of being located outside of Israel are not subject to Israeli censorship. Once published, the Israeli media can simply quote the story.

Israeli laws outlaws hate speech and "expressing support for illegal or terrorist organizations". Section 173 of the legal code makes it a crime to publish any "publication that is liable to crudely offend the religious faith or sentiment of others."

In addition to media censorship, Israeli cinemas are subject to regulation regarding the exhibition of pornography and television stations face restrictions on early broadcasting of programs that are unsuitable for children.

Notable incidents 
 In 1960 two science fiction stories were published that circumvented censorship.  The first was about Rudolf Teichmann and told the story of Eichmann's kidnapping. Uri Avnery's HaOlam HaZeh magazine published a story about the Lavon Affair.
 Mordechai Vanunu who served 18 years in prison for treason and espionage was released in 2004, but is still under restrictions on speech and movement. A BBC reporter was barred from the country after publishing an interview with him without handing it over to the censors first.
 Israel has banned the use of the word Nakba in Israeli Arab schools and textbooks.  Israeli Prime Minister Benjamin Netanyahu justified the ban by saying that the term was "propaganda against Israel".
 The death of Ben Zygier in 2010, an Australian-Israeli citizen who was allegedly recruited by Mossad, was censored until Australian news media broke the story in early 2013.
 Early in 2016, the Military Censor wrote to at least 30 Israeli bloggers and Facebook page owners, demanding that any postings with military or security-related content be submitted for review before publication. The request has the force of law.

Banned films 
Israel banned all films produced in Germany from 1956 until 1967.
 1957: The Girl in the Kremlin was banned because it may have harmed Israel's diplomatic relations with Moscow.
 1957: China Gate was banned in Israel for indulging in excessive cruelty.  The Israeli film censorship board indicated the film depicted Chinese and Russian soldiers as "monsters".
 1965: Goldfinger played for six weeks before the Nazi past of Gert Fröbe, who played the title villain, was disclosed, despite him leaving the party in 1937. However the ban was lifted once a Jewish family publicly thanked him for hiding two German Jews from the Gestapo during World War II.
 1973: Hitler: The Last Ten Days was banned in a unanimous decision by the censorship board that Alec Guinness's Hitler was represented in too human a light.
 1988: Martin Scorsese's The Last Temptation of Christ was banned on the grounds that it could hurt the feelings of Christian believers in the Holy Land. The Supreme Court of Israel later overturned the decision.
 2002: Jenin, Jenin was banned by the Israeli Film Ratings Board on the premise that it was libelous and might offend the public. The Supreme Court of Israel later overturned the decision.

See also 
 Freedom of speech in Israel
 Media of Israel
 Night letter

References 

 
Law of Israel
Israel